Kottur Soman ( 1942) is the oldest living elephant in the world, owned by the Kerala Forest Department.

The forest department of Kerala procured Soman from Thekkuthodu Kepramala area of Ranni Forest Division in 1968. After taking him to Konni elephant camp, he was trained and turned into a good Kumki elephant. Many elephants were trained under Soman until 1977, after which the government banned capturing of elephants from forest. In October 2020, an event was organised in the Kottur elephant sanctuary, where Soman was honoured by the other elephants in the sanctuary, as the authority was preparing to enter him into Guinness World Record for the oldest elephant, after his 78th birthday.

See also
 List of individual elephants

References

1942 animal births
Individual elephants
Elephants in Indian culture
Individual animals in India
Elephants in Hinduism
Elephants in Kerala